The royal consorts of Wessex were the wives of the reigning monarchs of the Kingdom of Wessex.  History has not always recorded whether each king of Wessex was married or not. In Wessex it was not customary for kings' wives to be queens but Judith was crowned queen following her marriage to Æthelwulf.

Wessex was an Anglo-Saxon kingdom in the south of Great Britain, from AD 519 until England was unified by Æthelstan (who never married) in AD 927. There have thus been no consorts of an independent Wessex since that date and the following consorts have been those of the monarch of England.

See also
List of monarchs of Wessex

References

Wessex
Consorts
Wessex
Wessex, List of royal consorts of